The Riederhorn (2,230 m) is a mountain of the Bernese Alps, overlooking Riederalp in the canton of Valais. It lies near the western end of the chain south of the Aletsch Glacier.

References

External links
Riederhorn on Hikr

Mountains of Valais
Mountains of the Alps
Mountains of Switzerland
Two-thousanders of Switzerland